The Setaphyta are a clade within the Bryophyta which includes Marchantiophytina (liverworts) and Bryophytina (mosses). Anthocerotophytina (hornworts) are excluded. A 2018 study found through molecular sequencing that liverworts are more closely related to mosses than hornworts, with the implication that liverworts were not among the first species to colonize land.

Phylogeny
There is strong phylogenetic evidence for Setaphyta.

References

Bryophytes
Plant unranked clades